Waria Rural LLG is a local-level government (LLG) of Morobe Province, Papua New Guinea.

Wards
01. Saiwarika
02. Arabuka
03. Gusuwe
04. Pagau
05. Kasuma
06. Gataipa
07. Sim
08. Wisi
09. Kasangare
10. Timanigosa
11. Garaina Station
12. Garaina
13. Tiaura
14. Peira
15. Garasa
16. Ohe
17. Biawaria

See also
Waria River

References

Local-level governments of Morobe Province